Damon Thomas may refer to:

Damon Thomas (record producer), American record producer, half of The Underdogs duo
Damon Thomas (politician), Australian public official, Lord Mayor of Hobart from 2011 to 2014
Damon Thomas (American football), American football player

See also
Damien Thomas (born 1942), actor